The Muger River (or Mujer) is a north-flowing tributary of the Abay River in central Ethiopia, which is notable for its deep gorge. Its confluence with the Abay is at: . Tributaries of the Muger include the Labbu. The Muger has a drainage area of about 8,188 square kilometers.

The Muger is important as a landmark because it marked the eastern boundary of the kingdom of Damot (before the Great Oromo migration forced that people across the Abay) and the western one of the district of Selale. Somewhere in the Guder-Muger valleys, the first recorded dinosaur fossil in the Horn of Africa was discovered in 1976. It was a single tooth of a carnosaur.

See also

List of rivers of Ethiopia

Notes 

Rivers of Ethiopia
Tributaries of the Blue Nile
Ethiopian Highlands
Geography of Oromia Region